Pterolophia postmedioalba is a species of beetle in the family Cerambycidae. It was described by Stephan von Breuning in 1961. It is known from Borneo.

References

postmedioalba
Beetles described in 1961